Oakley Farm may refer to:

Oakley Youth Development Center, also known as Oakley Farm, in Hinds County, Mississippi
Oakley Farm (Warm Springs, Virginia), listed on the National Register of Historic Places
Oakley Plantation House (St. Francisville, Louisiana), listed on the National Register of Historic Places

See also
Oakley House (disambiguation)